The 1959 German football championship Final decided the winner of the 1959 German football championship, the 49th edition of the German football championship, a knockout football cup competition contested by the regional league winners to determine the national champions.

The match was played on 28 June 1959 at the Olympiastadion in Berlin. Eintracht Frankfurt won the match 5–3 after extra time against Kickers Offenbach for their 1st German title. With the win, Eintracht Frankfurt qualified for the 1959–60 European Cup, where they went on to reach the final.

Route to the final
The German football championship was a nine team single-elimination knockout cup competition, featuring the champions and runners-up of the Oberliga Nord, West, Oberliga Südwest, and Oberliga Süd, and the champions of the Oberliga Berlin. The competition started with a qualification round between two teams in order to enter the group stage. During the group phase, four teams played each other in a home and away format, with the group winners advancing to the final.

Note: In all results below, the score of the finalist is given first (H: home; A: away).

Match

Details

References

1959
Eintracht Frankfurt matches
Kickers Offenbach matches
1958–59 in German football